Alpine skiing at the 2007 Asian Winter Games was held at the Beida Lake Skiing Resort in Changchun, China. Events were held from 31 January to 3 February 2007.

Schedule

Medalists

Men

Women

Medal table

Participating nations
A total of 85 athletes from 18 nations competed in alpine skiing at the 2007 Asian Winter Games:

References
 2007 Winter Asiad sports schedule

 
2007 Asian Winter Games events
2007
Asian Winter Games